Asterothyrium is a genus of leaf-dwelling lichens in the family Gomphillaceae.

Species
Asterothyrium argenteum 
Asterothyrium atromarginatum 
Asterothyrium bisporum 
Asterothyrium decipiens 
Asterothyrium filiforme 
Asterothyrium microthyrioides 
Asterothyrium octomerum 
Asterothyrium pallidum 
Asterothyrium rostratum 
Asterothyrium segmentatum 
Asterothyrium septemseptatum 
Asterothyrium subargenteum 
Asterothyrium vezdae

References

Ostropales
Lichen genera
Ostropales genera
Taxa described in 1890
Taxa named by Johannes Müller Argoviensis